Diosmetinidin is a 3-deoxyanthocyanidin.

References

External links
 13C CPMAS NMR and DFT calculations of anthocyanidins, M. Wolniaka and I. Wawer, 2008 

Anthocyanidins
Resorcinols
Phenol ethers